One of the Finest is a 1919 American silent comedy film directed by Harry Beaumont and starring Tom Moore, Seena Owen and Peaches Jackson.

Cast
 Tom Moore as Larry Hayes
 Seena Owen as Frances Hudson
 Peaches Jackson as Mary Jane
 Mollie McConnell as Mrs. Hayes
 Mary Warren as Nellie Andrews
 Hallam Cooley as Teddy
 Eddie Sturgis as Gus Andrews 
 Frederick Vroom as Robert Fulton Hudson
 Adelaide Elliot as Mrs. Hudson

References

Bibliography
 Langman, Larry. American Film Cycles: The Silent Era. Greenwood Publishing, 1998.

External links
 

1919 films
1919 comedy films
1910s English-language films
American silent feature films
Silent American comedy films
American black-and-white films
Films directed by Harry Beaumont
Goldwyn Pictures films
1910s American films